Danmei is a Chinese genre of literature and other fictional media that features romantic relationships between male characters. Danmei is typically created by and targeted towards a heterosexual female audience. While danmei works and their adaptations have achieved widespread popularity in China and globally, their legal status remains murky due to Chinese censorship policies. The female same-sex counterpart to danmei is known as bǎihé, which is an orthographic reborrowing of the Japanese word yuri, but it is not as well known or popular as danmei.

History
The male same-sex romance genre of "boys' love", or BL, originated in  Japanese manga in the early 1970s, and was introduced to mainland China via pirated Taiwanese translations of Japanese comics in the early 1990s. The term danmei is reborrowed from the Japanese word tanbi ("aestheticism"), and Chinese fans often use danmei and BL interchangeably.

By 1999 several online danmei forums had been founded. These venues started as communities for Chinese fans of Japanese BL, but soon began hosting fanworks and original danmei stories by young Chinese women. 1999 also saw the founding of the first print magazine devoted to danmei, Danmei Season, which was published continuously until 2013 despite not having an official permit to do so.

While early online danmei communities were largely run by amateur fans of the genre, those websites were gradually supplanted by a slew of commercial online fiction websites founded in the early 2000s. The largest of these, Jìnjiāng Wénxuéchéng, was founded in 2003 and has since amassed 7 million registered users and over 500,000 titles. The works published on  include both original works and fan fiction, and heterosexual, gay and lesbian romance as well as stories in other genres, but it is best known as a platform for original danmei novels.

Danmei reached wider audiences in China and elsewhere in the late 2010s, with censored danmei adaptations like Guardian (2018, Youku) and The Untamed (2019, Tencent Video) receiving billions of views and broad international distribution. In 2020, film and television producers purchased the rights to 59 danmei titles.

Genre characteristics
Danmei works always feature a central romance between men, but otherwise vary widely. Many draw on Chinese literary wuxia and  xianxia tropes and settings, or incorporate elements of other genres like sports or science fiction. 

It is common, but not universal, for the two male protagonists of a danmei work to be divided into gōng or "top" and shòu or "bottom" roles, which are analogous to the Japanese  seme and uke. Some works do not use these roles and instead refer to the protagonists as hùgōng. Danmei has been criticized for its adherence to "heteronormative" gender roles within same-sex relationships, but in recent years the genre has grown to contain a wide variety of different relationship dynamics.

Audience
Globally, danmei audiences vary somewhat in their demographics. Within the Chinese danmei fandom, straight women have been reported as predominant. Among danmei fans in the Anglosphere, the qualitative researcher Anna Madill wrote that "there is a sizable proportion of women with very heterogeneous sexual identifications (and uncertainties) and a relatively small, but not negligible, group of gay male fans." Due to danmei being primarily created and consumed by heterosexual women, danmei is considered to have a "female perspective" and "heteronormative frame". Fans of danmei cite equality between partners as part of the appeal of the genre, especially in comparison to heterosexual romance.

Female fans of danmei often refer to themselves as fǔ nǚ (lit. 'rotten woman') which is borrowed from the Japanese term fujoshi.

Media
Most popular danmei properties originate as web novels, which are published serially on websites like Jinjiang Literature City, Liancheng Read, and Danmei Chinese Web. Readers pay for new chapters as they are released. 

Complete novels may also be published as physical editions in China (either self-published or via Taiwan) and abroad. Fan translation of Chinese web novels, especially danmei, is widespread.

Danmei novels are often adapted as manhua (comics),  donghua (animation), audio dramas, and live action television series, which may or may not retain textual queer elements. Live action web series adaptations of danmei have achieved major commercial success via both producers and audiences' negotiation with the demands of the Chinese government censorship and broader consumer culture.

Original comics remain uncommon in danmei relative to Japanese BL, where manga is the dominant medium.

Censorship

Despite its popularity, danmei media is constantly at risk of legal action by the Chinese government as it "breaks two social taboos in one shot: pornography and homosexuality." Pornography is illegal in China, although the exact laws regarding its possession and distribution are blurry, and danmei literature with explicit sex scenes is unambiguously classified as pornography. Homosexuality itself has been decriminalized in China since 1997, but due to vague legal definitions of "obscenity" and "abnormal sexual behavior", even non-explicit queer literature may be subject to censorship.

Anti-porn crackdowns in 2004, 2010 and 2014 resulted in the closure of many danmei websites and forums. In 2011, Chinese authorities shut down a danmei website hosting 1,200 works and its founder, Wang Ming, was fined and jailed for 18 months. In October 2018, a female danmei author who wrote under the pen name Tianyi was sentenced to 10 years in prison after her self-published homoerotic novel featuring rape and teacher-student romance sold over 7,000 copies, violating laws regarding excessive commercial profit for unregistered books. 

The strict censorship policies cause some danmei communities to self-police, with sites such as Jinjiang Literature City asking its readers to report explicit works for deletion. Some mainland Chinese danmei authors circumvent the restrictions on pornography by hosting the explicit portions of their work on Taiwanese literature websites. 

In early 2016, the gay web drama Addicted (based on a Chinese boys' love novel) was abruptly removed from all mainland Chinese streaming platforms before it finished airing on orders from the State Administration of Press, Publication, Radio, Film and Television (SAPPRFT). The following week, the China Television Drama Production Industry Association publicized guidelines dated December 31, 2015 that banned television portrayals of "abnormal sexual relationships and behaviors", including same-sex relationships. These new guidelines impacted web dramas, which have historically had fewer restrictions than broadcast television. The SAPPRFT went on to issue even stricter regulations regarding online shows in June 2017.

Several danmei novels have been adapted as live action web dramas since 2017, skirting the regulations by removing explicit queer romance elements while retaining queer subtext. In 2018, shortly after releasing its final episode, live action danmei adaptation Guardian was pulled from streaming platforms for "content adjustments" following a directive from the SAPPRFT to "clean up TV programmes of harmful and vulgar content". It was later re-released with scenes edited or deleted, but none of which had to do with homoerotic subtext.

To comply with censorship policies, large budget adaptations will often replace an explicitly homosexual romance with a homosocial deep friendship instead, possibly leaving the possibility of more intentionally vague.  Adaptations featuring such non-romantic relationships are sometimes called dangai instead.

See also
Gay romance
Slash fiction
Yaoi

References

 
Shōnen-ai
Anime and manga terminology
Gay male mass media
Gay male erotica
Gay art
LGBT terminology
Male homosexuality
Chinese art
LGBT-related mass media in China